Charles Wallace Chapman (4 August 1897 - December 1979) was a British mechanical engineer, who designed the first diesel engine suitable for an automobile, the high speed diesel engine (compression ignition engine).

Early life
He was born in Lancaster, Lancashire.

He attended Lancaster Royal Grammar School. He served in the First World War as a lieutenant in the RNVR. He later gained a master's degree in engineering from the University of Liverpool.

Career

Petters
In the 1920s he worked as personal assistant to Sir Ernest Petter, who owned Petters (Ipswich) Ltd. At this company he worked with Frank Perkins.

Perkins Engines
On 7 June 1932 he jointly founded Perkins Engines in Peterborough (then in Northamptonshire) with Frank Perkins (engineer), who he first met in 1929. Perkins Engines was created to build high speed diesel engines. Francis Arthur Perkins was the businessman, and Charles Chapman provided technical skill.

During the Second World War, he designed the Perkins S6 marine diesel engine, which powered the Royal Navy's air-sea rescue craft. He also designed the T1 engine for boats, which was not made. He resigned from Perkins in November 1942. Frank Perkins died in 1967.

Second World War
During the Second World War he carried out work for the Air Ministry.

Personal life
He died in Winchelsea in East Sussex, aged 82 in 1979.

See also
 History of the diesel car
 List of diesel automobiles

References

 Times obituary, 3 December 1979, page 14

External links
 Grace's Guides
 Perkins is Peterborough
 Biography

1897 births
1979 deaths
Alumni of the University of Liverpool
British automotive pioneers
British company founders
British mechanical engineers
History of the diesel engine
Manufacturing company founders
People associated with the internal combustion engine
People educated at Lancaster Royal Grammar School
People from Lancaster, Lancashire
Perkins engines
Royal Navy officers of World War I
People from Winchelsea
20th-century British businesspeople